Marion B. Hollins (December 3, 1892 – August 27, 1944) was an American amateur golfer. She is known as an athlete and as a golf course developer, one of the only known female golf course developers in history. She won the 1921 U.S. Women's Amateur and was runner-up in 1913. She also had many other amateur wins. She was the captain of the first U.S. Curtis Cup team in 1932.

Early life

Hollins was born on December 3, 1892 in East Islip, New York. Her father, Henry (Harry) Bowly Hollins Sr. (1854–1938), owned a Wall Street brokerage firm, H.B. Hollins & Co. Her mother was Evelina Meserole Knapp (1854–1938). The family lived on the  Meadow Farm at East Islip on Long Island. By 18, Hollins learned how to ride and drive horses, row, swim, play tennis, and golf. She won a four-in-hand carriage competition against male drivers. In 1913, she was runner-up in the U.S. Women's Metropolitan Amateur, and at 20 she won the Metropolitan Amateur and went into the finals of the U.S. Women's Amateur. In 1916, Hollins came to California to play polo with the Sam Mateo team.

Career
Hollins returned to California as early as 1920 to play polo on the Bebble Beach men's polo team, and play golf at the Pebble Beach Golf Links. She set a women's record with a score of 90. Hollins then bought a piece of property overlooking the Pebble Beach course and Carmel Bay. She won the 1921 U.S. Women's Amateur at the Hollywood Golf Club, against Alexa Stirling.

Hollins moved to the Monterey Peninsula in 1922 where she met S.F.B. Morse and began working as athletic director for Del Monte Properties.

The first Pebble Beach Championship for Women was played February 9-12, 1923, with Hollins as champion over defeated Doreen Kavanaugh in the final match. Hollins won the Pebble Beach Championship title six times (1924-1926, 1928, 1933, and 1942). 

In her time, she helped develop three world-class golf courses: The Women's National Golf and Tennis Club in Glen Head, Long Island, New York; Cypress Point Club, and Pasatiempo Golf Club. Hollins was responsible for hiring Alister MacKenzie to design Cypress Point and Pasatiempo. Seth Raynor routed Cypress Point but died before it was built; she was ultimately the reason Bobby Jones hired MacKenzie to design Augusta National Golf Club.

In 1927, Hollins bought  in Carmel Valley from Morse's Del Monte Properties, where she entertained guests such as Sir Montagu Allan, his wife, and daughter from Montreal, Canada. In 1936, she sold  of her ranch to real estate developer Frank B. Porter Hollins for $32,000.

In December 1937, Hollins was in an automobile accident near Watsonville, that caused lasting physical and mental injuries.

After the Wall Street Crash of 1929, Hollins was forced to sell property she had in Big Sur and her Pasatiempo home. Morse stepped in and helped Hollins get back on her feet with work at the Del Monte Properties Company. Hollins played golf with friends or hotel guests. In 1942, she won the Pebble Beach Women's Championship for the eighth and final time.

Death
Hollins died from complications of a stroke on August 27, 1944, in Pacific Grove, California, at the age of 51, and was buried in Monterey, California.

Legacy
Hollins was inducted posthumously into the Suffolk Sports Hall of Fame on Long Island in the Golf and Historic Recognition Categories with the Class of 2002. She will be inducted into the World Golf Hall of Fame in 2021.

Team appearances
Curtis Cup (representing the United States): 1932 (winners, playing captain)

References

External links

Marion Hollins Memorial Project

American female golfers
Amateur golfers
Golf course architects
Winners of ladies' major amateur golf championships
World Golf Hall of Fame inductees
Golfers from New York (state)
People from East Islip, New York
1892 births
1944 deaths
20th-century American women